is a Japanese actor who is represented by the talent agency CES.

Katsurayama's hobbies include recreational driving, collecting mini-cars, karaoke, outdoor sports, as well as playing the saxophone.

Filmography

TV series

Films

References

External links
Official profile 
 

Japanese male actors
1972 births
Living people
Actors from Mie Prefecture